Party Line is a 1988 American slasher film directed by William Webb.

Plot
Two siblings lure married men from a party line so their disturbed brother can slit their throats with a straight razor. A detective investigates with his captain.

Cast

References

External links

1988 films
1988 horror films
American slasher films
American independent films
Films about telephony
1980s slasher films
1980s English-language films
1980s American films